Cingulina aikeni is a species of sea snail, a marine gastropod mollusk in the family Pyramidellidae.

Original description
       Poppe G.T., Tagaro S.P. & Goto Y. (2018). New marine species from the Central Philippines. Visaya. 5(1): 91-135.
page(s): 113, pl. 14 figs 1-2.

References

External links
 Worms Link

Pyramidellidae
Gastropods described in 2018